Vitalii Shupliak (born 23 February 1993 in Berezhany, Ukraine) is a Ukrainian artist who currently lives in Berlin.

References

External links
 Official website

1993 births
Living people
Ukrainian painters
Ukrainian male painters
People from Berezhany
Ukrainian artists